By-elections to the 33rd Canadian Parliament were held to fill vacancies in the House of Commons of Canada between the 1984 federal election and the 1988 federal election. The Progressive Conservative Party of Canada led a majority government for the entirety of the 33rd Canadian Parliament, though their number did decrease from by-elections.

Eleven seats became vacant during the life of the Parliament. Six of these vacancies were filled through by-elections, and five seats remained vacant when the 1988 federal election was called.

See also
List of federal by-elections in Canada

Sources
 Parliament of Canada–Elected in By-Elections 

1988 elections in Canada
1987 elections in Canada
1986 elections in Canada
33rd